Eucalyptus provecta is a species of small tree that is endemic to Queensland. It has rough, fibrous to flaky bark on the trunk and branches, lance-shaped adult leaves, flower buds in groups of seven on the ends of branchlets, white flowers and cup-shaped fruit.

Description
It has rough, grey, fibrous to flaky bark on the trunk and branches. Flowering has been recorded in January, May, June, July and October and the flowers are white.

Taxonomy
Eucalyptus provecta was first formally described in 2000 by Anthony Bean in the journal Austrobaileya from material collected near Forsayth in 1997. The specific epithet (provecta) is from the Latin word provectus meaning "advanced", "carried forward" or "extended", referring to the rough bark extending to the branches.

Distribution and habitat
This tree occurs in far north Queensland from the Bulleringa National Park to Chuddleigh Park station north of Hughenden.

Conservation status
This eucalypt is classified as "least concern" under the Queensland Government Nature Conservation Act 1992.

See also
List of Eucalyptus species

References

Trees of Australia
provecta
Myrtales of Australia
Flora of Queensland
Plants described in 2000